Berkeh Lari (also Romanized as Berkeh Lārī, Barkeh Lari, and Berkeh-ye Lārī) is a village in Deh Tall Rural District, in the Central District of Bastak County, Hormozgan Province, Iran. At the 2006 census, its population was 713, in 162 families.

References 

Populated places in Bastak County